The Mutter Gottes Historic District or Mother of God Historic District is a  area in Covington, Kentucky including the Mother of God Church which was listed on the National Register of Historic Places in 1980.  The historic district included 153 buildings.

The  is a parish church of the Roman Catholic Diocese of Covington located at 119 West 6th Street in Covington.  It was separately listed on the National Register in 1973.

The district's boundaries were extended later in 1980 by a revised National Register listing which added seven contributing buildings.

References

Historic districts on the National Register of Historic Places in Kentucky
National Register of Historic Places in Kenton County, Kentucky
Italian Renaissance Revival architecture in the United States
German-American culture in Kentucky